Arizona Rush was an American women's soccer team, founded in 2007. The team was a member of the Women's Premier Soccer League, the third tier of women's soccer in the United States and Canada, until 2010. The team played in the North Division of the Big Sky Conference.

The team played its home games at Murphey Field on the campus of the University of Arizona in Tucson, Arizona. The club's colors were royal blue and white.

Year-by-year

Notable former players
The following former players have played at the senior international and/or professional level:
  Sylvia Gee

Honors
 WPSL Big Sky Conference Champions 2008

Coaches
  Chris Fernandez 2008–present

Stadia
 Murphey Field, Tucson, Arizona 2008–present

External links
 Official website
 WPSL Arizona Rush page

2007 establishments in Arizona
Soccer clubs in Arizona
Association football clubs established in 2007
Women's Premier Soccer League teams
Women's sports in Arizona